Alucita ferruginea is a species of moth of the family Alucitidae. It is known from South Africa.

References

Endemic moths of South Africa
Alucitidae
Moths of Africa
Moths described in 1881